Aleksej is a Serbo-Croatian and Belarusian masculine given name, a variant of Greek Alexis and Alexios (Latinized form Alexius). The name Aljoša is a diminutive of the name. It may refer to:

Aleksej Nešović, Serbian basketballer
Aleksej Nikolić, Slovenian basketballer
Aleksej Aleksandrov, Belarusian chess player

See also
Alexey, Russian variant
Aleksejs, Latvian variant
Aleksije, Serbian variant

Serbian masculine given names
Belarusian masculine given names